Vallecillosaurus is an extinct genus of mosasauroid from the Late Cretaceous period, that lived in Mexico, in the state of Nuevo León.

See also

 List of mosasaurs

References

External links
 Oceans of Kansas

Mosasaurs
Fossils of Mexico
Mosasaurs of North America
Fossil taxa described in 2008

zh:莫那龍